Kasin (also Romanized as Kāsīn; also known as Chasin) is a village in Ozomdel-e Jonubi Rural District of the Central District of Varzaqan County, East Azerbaijan province, Iran. At the 2006 National Census, its population was 1,917 in 430 households. The following census in 2011 counted 2,178 people in 552 households. The latest census in 2016 showed a population of 2,780 people in 840 households; it was the largest village in its rural district.

References 

Varzaqan County

Populated places in East Azerbaijan Province

Populated places in Varzaqan County